Electoral history of Strom Thurmond, 103rd Governor of South Carolina (1947–1951), United States Senator from South Carolina (1954–1956, 1956–2003; Democrat until 1964 and Republican after), 1948 States' Rights Democrats presidential nominee and President pro tempore of the United States Senate (1981–1987, 1995–2001 and 2001).

Thurmond's over 70 years electoral career begun from successful election for the county attorney in 1930 and continued until 2003. 

Democratic primary for Governor of South Carolina, 1946:
 Strom Thurmond – 96,691 (33.43%)
 James C. McLeod – 83,464 (28.86%)
 Ransome Judson Williams (inc.) – 35,813 (12.38%)
 John C. Taylor – 22,447 (7.76%)
 Dell O'Neall – 16,574 (5.73%)
 John D. Long – 16,503 (5.71%)
 Carl B. Epps – 5,189 (1.79%)
 Marcus A. Stone – 4,353 (1.51%)
 A. L. Wood – 3,040 (1.05%)
 A. J. Beattie – 2,889 (1.00%)
 Roger W. Scott – 2,251 (0.78%)

Democratic primary runoff for Governor of South Carolina, 1946:
 Strom Thurmond – 144,420 (56.95%)
 James C. McLeod – 109,169 (43.05%)

South Carolina gubernatorial election, 1946:
 Strom Thurmond (D) – 26,520 (100.00%)

1948 United States presidential election:
 Harry S. Truman/Alben W. Barkley (D) – 24,179,347 (49.6%) and 303 electoral votes (57.06%, 28 states carried) 
 Thomas E. Dewey/Earl Warren (R) – 21,991,292 (45.1%) and 189 electoral votes (35.59%, 16 states carried)
 Strom Thurmond/Fielding L. Wright (Dixiecrat) – 1,175,930 (2.4%) and 39 electoral votes (7.35%, 4 states carried) 
 Henry A. Wallace/Glen H. Taylor (Progressive) – 1,157,328 (2.4%)
 Norman Thomas/Tucker P. Smith (Socialist) – 139,569 (0.3%)
 Claude Watson/Dale Learn (Prohibition) – 103,708 (0.2%)
 Others – 46,361 (0.1%)

Democratic primary for the United States Senate from South Carolina, 1950:
 Olin D. Johnston (inc.) – 186,180 (53.95%)
 Strom Thurmond – 158,904 (46.05%)

United States Senate election in South Carolina, 1954:
 Strom Thurmond (Independent Democrat) (write-in) – 143,444 (63.13%)
 Edgar A. Brown (D) – 83,525 (36.76%)
 Marcus A. Stone (write-in) – 240 (0.11%)

United States Senate special election in South Carolina, 1956:
 Strom Thurmond (D) (inc.) – 245,371 (100.00%)

United States Senate election in South Carolina, 1960:
 Strom Thurmond (D) (inc.) – 330,167 (99.97%)
 Others (write-in) – 102 (0.03%)

1960 United States presidential election:
 John F. Kennedy/Lyndon B. Johnson (D) – 34,220,984 (49.7%) and 303 electoral votes (56.43%, 22 states carried)
 Richard Nixon/Henry Cabot Lodge, Jr. (R) – 34,108,157 (49.6%) and 219 electoral votes (40.78%, 26 states carried)
 Harry F. Byrd/Strom Thurmond (I) – 286,359 (0.4%) and 14 electoral votes (2.61%, 2 states carried)
 Harry F. Byrd/Barry Goldwater (I) – 1 electoral vote (0.19%, Oklahoma faithless elector)
 Orval E. Faubus/John G. Crommelin (State's Rights) – 44,984 (0.1%)
 Charles L. Sullivan/Merritt Curtis (Constitution) – 18,162 (0.0%)
 Others – 216,982 (0.3%)

United States Senate election in South Carolina, 1966:
 Strom Thurmond (R) (inc.) – 271,297 (62.19%)
 Bradley Morrah, Jr. (D) – 164,955 (37.81%)

United States Senate election in South Carolina, 1972:
 Strom Thurmond (R) (inc.) – 415,806 (63.29%)
 Nick Ziegler (D) – 241,056 (36.69%)
 Others (write-in) – 172 (0.03%)

United States Senate election in South Carolina, 1978:
 Strom Thurmond (R) (inc.) – 351,917 (55.68%)
 Charles D. Ravenel (D) – 280,146 (44.32%)

President pro tempore of the United States Senate, 1981:
 Strom Thurmond (R) – 53 (53.54%)
 John C. Stennis (D) – 46 (46.47%)

President pro tempore of the United States Senate, 1983:
 Strom Thurmond (R) (inc.) – 54 (54.00%)
 John C. Stennis (D) – 46 (46.00%)

Republican primary for the United States Senate from South Carolina, 1984:
 Strom Thurmond (inc.) – 44,662 (94.31%)
 Bob Cunningham – 2,693 (5.69%)

United States Senate election in South Carolina, 1984:
 Strom Thurmond (R) (inc.) – 644,815 (66.81%)
 Melvin Purvis (D) – 306,982 (31.81%)
 Stephen Davis (LBT) – 13,333 (1.38%)

President pro tempore of the United States Senate, 1985:
 Strom Thurmond (R) (inc.) – 53 (53.00%)
 John C. Stennis (D) – 47 (47.00%)

President pro tempore of the United States Senate, 1987:
 John C. Stennis (D) – 55 (55.00%)
 Strom Thurmond (R) (inc.) – 45 (45.00%)

President pro tempore of the United States Senate, 1989:
 Robert Byrd (D) – 55 (55.00%)
 Strom Thurmond (R) – 45 (45.00%)

United States Senate election in South Carolina, 1990:
 Strom Thurmond (R) (inc.) – 482,032 (64.21%)
 Bob Cunningham (D) – 244,112 (32.52%)
 William H. Griffin (LBT) – 13,805 (1.84%)
 Marion C. Metts (American) – 10,317 (1.37%)
 Write-ins – 450 (0.06%)

President pro tempore of the United States Senate, 1991:
 Robert Byrd (D) (inc.) – 56 (56.00%)
 Strom Thurmond (R) – 44 (44.00%)

President pro tempore of the United States Senate, 1993:
 Robert Byrd (D) (inc.) – 57 (57.00%)
 Strom Thurmond (R) – 43 (43.00%)

President pro tempore of the United States Senate, 1995:
 Strom Thurmond (R) – 52 (52.00%)
 Robert Byrd (D) (inc.) – 48 (48.00%)

Republican primary for the United States Senate from South Carolina, 1996:
 Strom Thurmond (inc.) – 132,145 (60.62%)
 Harold G. Worley – 65,666 (30.12%)
 Charlie Thompson – 20,185 (9.26%) 

United States Senate election in South Carolina, 1996:
 Strom Thurmond (R) (inc.) – 620,326 (53.38%)
 Elliott Close (D) – 511,226 (43.99%)
 Richard T. Quillian (LBT) – 12,994 (1.12%)
 Peter J. Ashy (Reform) – 9,741 (0.84%)
 Annette C. Estes (Natural Law) – 7,697 (0.66%)
 Others – 141 (0.01%)

President pro tempore of the United States Senate, 1997:
 Strom Thurmond (R) (inc.) – 55 (55.00%)
 Robert Byrd – 45 (45.00%)  

President pro tempore of the United States Senate, 1999:
 Strom Thurmond (R) (inc.) – 55 (55.00%)
 Robert Byrd – 45 (45.00%) 

President pro tempore of the United States Senate, January 3, 2001:
 Robert Byrd (D) – 51 (50.50%)
 Strom Thurmond (R) (inc.) – 50 (49.51%)

Vice President Al Gore cast tie-breaking vote

President pro tempore of the United States Senate, January 20, 2001:
 Strom Thurmond (R) – 51 (50.50%)
 Robert Byrd (D) (inc.) – 50 (49.51%)

Vice President Dick Cheney cast tie-breaking vote

President pro tempore of the United States Senate, June 6, 2001:
 Robert Byrd (D) – 51 (51.00%)
 Strom Thurmond (R) (inc.) – 49 (49.00%)

President pro tempore emeritus of the United States Senate, June 6, 2001:
 Strom Thurmond (R) – 100 (100.00%)

References

Thurmond, Strom
Strom Thurmond
History of South Carolina
Politics of South Carolina